Sagbara is a taluka in Narmada district, Gujarat, India.
Its location is at NH-753B (Old SH-13) Ankleshwar-Valia-Netrang-Dediapada-Sagbara up to State Border to Akkalkuva in Maharashtra

Demographics 
Religion

Hindu, Muslim, and also Christians.

Languages 

Gujarati, Hindi, Marathi and most of people speaks regional language (Vasava-Adiwasi).
Mainly "Vasavi" language is spoken by the people with the surnames of Vasava, Valvi, Vasave, and Naik.

Important places 
Hospitals

Prakruti Genaeral Hospital 
Jeevandeep (Mission) Dispensary 
Civil Hospital

Schools and Colleges

J.K. High School (Sagbara-Songadh Road)
St. Stephen's English Medium School (Selamba-Ghansera Road) 
Waymade English Medium School (Sagbara-Songadh Road) 
Navrachna High School and Higher Secondary School (Mission School)  (NH-753B)
Govt. Arts and Science College (Pankhalla Road).

Temple and travel

Devmogra Mataji Tample (Yahamogi) 
Chandshah Vali Baba Dargah
Hanuman Hill
Panya Water Fall 
Chopadvav Dam

Trade Center

Selamba

Banks

Bank Of Baroda
State Bank of India
Bharcuh District Co-op Bank 
The Gujarat State Co-Op 
Agriculture and Rural Development Bank

Transportation
Sagbara is well connected with National Highway (NH-753B) and State Highway. It is connected with State Transport bus service with Ahmedabad, Vadodara, Surat, Bhavnagar, Rajkot, Gandhinagar, Ambaji, Rajpipla, Bharuch, Valsad, Navsari, Bardoli, Jambusar, Mansa, Pawagadh, Halol, Bodeli, Nizar, Sogadh, Vyara, Olpad, Palanpur and also with Maharashtra state's cities including Aurangabad, Dhuliya, Jalgaon, Nandurbar, Shirpur, Shahada, Talode, Akkalkuva, Yawal, Chopada, Amalner. The private luxury buses and travels also available for Vadodara, Ahmedabad, Rajkot. Nearest railway station is Ankleshwar (95 km) and nearest airports are Surat (135 km) and Vadodara (145 km).

References

Narmada district
Talukas of Gujarat